The 2018 Taça Nacional de Cabo Verde is the 6th edition of the Taça Nacional de Cabo Verde, the knockout football competition of Cape Verde. The competition, which is played out in a tournament between the cup winners of the nine islands, returns for the first time since 2012.

Preliminary stage

North Zone
Santo Antão Norte:	Rosariense Clube da Ribeira Grande (Ribeira Grande)
Santo Antão Sul:		Associação Académica do Porto Novo (Porto Novo)
São Vicente:		Batuque Futebol Clube (Mindelo)
São Nicolau:		Futebol Clube Ultramarina

Qualifying round [May 26]

Académica do Porto Novo	1-0 Rosariense

Batuque		 	4-1 Ultramarina

Center Zone
Sal:			Sport Clube Santa Maria (Santa Maria)
Boa Vista:		Sport Sal-Rei Clube (Sal-Rei)

Qualifying round [May 27]

Santa Maria		4-0 Sal-Rei

South Zone

Group 1
Maio:			Club Desportivo Onze Unidos (Porto Inglês)
Santiago Norte:		  regional cup not played
Santiago Sul:		Sporting Clube da Praia (Cidade da Praia)

Qualifying round [May 27]

Onze Unidos		1-1 Sporting da Praia		[1-1 aet; 1-2 pen]

Group 2
Fogo:			Associação Académica do Fogo (São Filipe)
Brava:			Sport Clube Morabeza (Nova Sintra)

Qualifying round [May 27]
Académica Fogo		1-1 Morabeza			[1-1 aet; 0-3 pen]

First stage
Qualifying round [Jun 1]

Académica do Porto Novo	0-2 Sporting da Praia

Batuque			bye

Santa Maria		bye

Morabeza		bye

Final stage
Played at Estádio da Várzea, Cidade da Praia.

Semi-finals
[Jun 6]

Batuque			1-1 Sporting da Praia		[2-4 pen]

[Jun 7]

Santa Maria		1-0 Morabeza

Final
[Jun 9]

Sporting da Praia	2-1 Santa Maria

See also
2018 Cape Verdean Football Championships

References

Cape Verde
Cup
Football competitions in Cape Verde
2017–18 in Cape Verdean football